Lauren Anderson may refer to:

 Lauren Anderson (dancer) (born 1965), American ballet dancer
 Lauren Anderson (model) (born 1980), American model